Frank Kershaw (11 December 1879 – 5 May 1959) was an English first-class cricketer.

Kershaw was born at Horsforth in December 1879. He was educated at Cheltenham College, before going up to Trinity College, Oxford. He later toured British India with the Oxford University Authentics in 1902–03, making two first-class appearances on the tour against Bombay and the Parsees. He scored 43 runs in his two first-class matches, with a high score of 36. He died at Frinton-on-Sea in May 1959.

References

External links

1879 births
1959 deaths
People from Horsforth
People educated at Cheltenham College
Alumni of Trinity College, Oxford
English cricketers
Oxford University Authentics cricketers